Kingsley Club is a private golf course located near Kingsley, Michigan.  Opened in 2001 with the motto "In the spirit of the game", the course is private.

Facilities
Unlike many modern courses with extravagant clubhouses, the Kingsley Club's facilities are relatively low-key; the course is located on a dirt road (which narrows to a single lane at one point) well away from the nearest highway.  The clubhouse holds just a small pro shop and food service area.  Cottages overlooking the 17th hole are available for rental to members.  The course features a practice putting green and driving range.  Golfers can either walk the course or ride in electric carts, and forecaddies are available for player assistance.

Course
Designed to evoke links-style golf from the British Isles, the course is covered with rolling hills of natural terrain and more than 120 bunkers.  Course designer Mike DeVries used much of the natural landscape to shape the course, moving only about 20,000 cubic yards of earth during construction; one member described the natural construction of the course by saying "They found the course on the land. They moved only a little dirt to uncover it."

The member tees are a mixture of championship tees (holes 2, 4, 8, 11, 13, and 18) and blue tees.  The par-3 ninth hole has two separate sets of tee boxes; the longer tees approach the green from the south, the shorter from the west.

In 2013, Golfweek magazine ranked the course the 24th on its list of the best modern courses. Links Magazine placed the course as the 57th best course in the United States

References

External links
 Hole-by-hole review of Kingsley Club
 Golf Digest "Where's Matty G" travel blog visits northern Michigan

Golf clubs and courses in Michigan